Samuel Spruill served in the Provincial Assembly of North Carolina from 1754 until his death in 1760. He was the son of Dr. Godfrey Spruill, the patriarch of the Spruill family in the United States and the first doctor in North Carolina.

References

Sources 
Pea Ridge (Washington County), NC History

1760 deaths
Year of birth missing
People of colonial North Carolina
18th-century American people